The Sylvers is the debut album by the Los Angeles, California-based R&B group the Sylvers. The album was released on MGM Records subsidiary Pride Records, a label founded by record and film producer Michael Viner. Released in 1972, it was produced by R&B legends Jerry Butler (of the Impressions) and Keg Johnson.

This album released three singles: "Fool's Paradise", "Wish I Could Talk to You" and "I'll Never Be Ashamed".

In 2013, Dusty Groove Records reissued their debut on vinyl.

Reception

Track listing
 All songs written by Leon Sylvers III, except where noted
"Wish That I Could Talk to You" (2:53)
"Fool's Paradise" (2:28)
"Only One Can Win" (3:00)
"I'm Truly Happy" – (Jerry Peters) (2:48)
"Touch Me Jesus" – (Brian Holland, Lamont Dozier, A. Bond) (3:25)
"I Know Myself" (3:32)
"Chaos" (3:12)
"So Close" (2:52)
"I'll Never Be Ashamed" – (James Sylvers) (3:13)
"How Love Hurts" (4:16)

Personnel
 Jerry Butler - producer
 Keg Johnson - producer
 Michael Viner - executive producer
 David Crawford - arranger
 Jerry Peters - arranger

References

1972 debut albums
The Sylvers albums
MGM Records albums